The 1979–80 Algerian Cup is the 18th edition of the Algerian Cup. MA Hussein Dey are the defending champions, having beaten JE Tizi Ouzou 2–1 in the previous season's final.

Round of 64

Round of 32

Round of 16

Quarter-finals

Semi-finals

Final

Match

References

Algerian Cup
Algerian Cup
Algerian Cup